Rachel Jamison Webster (born 1974) is an American writer. She is the author of the book September, published by the TriQuarterly imprint of Northwestern University Press in 2013; The Endless Unbegun, published by Twelve Winters Press in 2015, and Mary is a River, a finalist for the National Poetry Series that was published by Kelsay Books in 2018. She published two chapbooks with Dancing Girl Press:  The Blue Grotto (2009) and Hazel and the Mirror (2015). She edited two anthologies of creative writing by Chicago Teens, Alchemy (2001) and Paper Atrium (2205). Webster co-founded the online anthology of international poetry, UniVerse, with her late partner Richard Fammeree.

Early life
Webster was born in Madison, Ohio. She attended DePaul University in Chicago, Illinois and then transferred to Lewis & Clark College in Portland, Oregon, where she graduated magna cum laude with a B.A. in English Literature. She earned her M.F.A. from Warren Wilson’s Program for Writers.

Honors
Webster has received awards from the Academy of American Poets, the American Association of University Women, the Howard Foundation, and the Poetry Foundation. From 2017-2018, she participated in the OpEd/Public Voices Fellowship. In 2017, Webster was named a Hewlett Fellow for her establishment of curriculum highlighting diversity and social inequalities. In 2018, Northwestern University recognized her with an Arts and Sciences Alumni Teaching Award for excellence in teaching.

External links
 
 UniVerse of Poetry

References

1974 births
Living people
American women poets
DePaul University alumni
21st-century American women